Queen's College is a co-educational independent school located in Taunton, the county town of Somerset, England. It is a day/boarding school for pupils aged 0–18. The school incorporates nursery, pre-prep, Prep, and senior schools. The current Head of College is Julian Noad. Henry Matthews is headmaster of Queen's College Prep School.

History

First known as the Wesleyan Collegiate Institute, Queen's College was established by the Wesleyan Methodist Church in 1843. Originally located in the Norman Castle in the town centre, the school opened with 34 pupils on 12 July 1843.

Under the headship of Thomas Sibley the school outgrew the old school classrooms and so a new building was commissioned in 1845 in the Trull area. Due to the increasing popularity of the school, they were forced to vacate the castle premises in 1847 and move into the new building before it was finished. The current school building is a symmetrical Tudor Gothic building built by Giles and Gane in 1845 and has been designated as a Grade II* listed building. The original school site consisted of the main school building and upper playing fields. Since then the buildings have expanded, with the bridge and library (now known as the Old Music Room) being added to the school in the 1920s. This addition was built in commemoration, along with the obelisk on the front lawn, for those who served in the First World War.

The college's motto is non scholae sed vitae discimus ("We educate not just for school but for life’")

Present day 

Since the 1970s the school has been co-educational with both female and male boarding houses being present on the school grounds.  In 2016 the school appointed their first female head teacher, Lorraine Earps. Earps was replaced by Julian Noad on the 12th August 2021.

The school is part of the Methodist trust.

Pastoral system

The prep school is split into four day houses and one boarding house, each accepting both boys and girls. The houses are named after local hill ranges: Quantocks, Brendons, Blackdowns and Mendips.  The senior school operates a 'horizontal' pastoral system with students in year groups, each with a designated year lead.

Notable former pupils

Former pupils are known as Old Queenians, and include:
 Ben Ackland - Irish cricketer
 John Baron - Conservative MP
 Sir Robert Bond — Prime Minister of Newfoundland 1900–1909
 Richard Browning - inventor of a "jet suit"; founder and chief test pilot of 'Gravity Industries'
 Arthur Henry Reginald Buller - mycologist and President of the Royal Society of Canada
 Matthew Clay - 2006 Commonwealth Games Gold Medallist in Swimming
 Carrie Davis - Radio 1 sports analyst
 Sir Nicholas Barton "Nick" Harvey - Liberal Democrat MP
 Sir Robert Hart — Inspector-General of China's Imperial Maritime Customs Service 1863–1907
 Arthur Henderson — Labour politician, Baron Rowley of Rowley Regis, Secretary of State for Air 1947–1951
 Peter Honess - Oscar-nominated, BAFTA award-winning Hollywood film editor (L. A. Confidential); member of the Academy of Motion Picture Arts and Sciences
 Peter Mitchell - 1978 Nobel Prize Winner (chemistry)
 James Owen - Theoretical Astrophysicist
 Martin Pipe - racehorse trainer
 Dean Ryan - England international rugby union player and head coach of Gloucester RFU Club
 Leighton Seager - 1st Baron Leighton of St Mellons, shipping magnate
 Sir George Shenton — Mayor of Perth, Western Australia 1880–1884 & 1886–1888
 Harold Arthur Watkinson — Conservative politician and businessman, 1st Viscount Watkinson of Woking, Minister of Defence 1959–1962
 John Passmore Widgery- Baron Widgery of South Molton, Lord Chief Justice of England and Wales 1971–1980
 James Howard Williams (Elephant Bill) - British Army officer and author
 Ed Weeks - actor
Jake Lintott - Hampshire County Cricket Club
 Tom Austen - English actor, known for his television appearances portraying Jasper Frost on The Royals and Guy Hopkins on Grantchester

Headteachers
Lorraine Earps then became the first female head teacher of Queen's College. on 12 August 2021 Julian Noad took over from Earps as Head of College.  The current head of the prep school is Henry Matthews.

A former headmaster at the school was found guilty by a professional conduct panel of "unacceptable professional conduct" over a series of allegations.

References

External links
 School Website
 Profile on the ISC website
 Profile on the Good Schools Guide

Member schools of the Headmasters' and Headmistresses' Conference
Private schools in Somerset
Boarding schools in Somerset
Methodist schools in England
Schools in Taunton
Educational institutions established in 1843
1843 establishments in England